Eagle is the common name for many large birds of prey of the family Accipitridae. Eagles belong to several groups of genera, some of which are closely related. Most of the 68 species of eagles are from Eurasia and Africa. Outside this area, just 14 species can be found—2 in North America, 9 in Central and South America, and 3 in Australia.

Eagles are not a natural group but denote essentially any kind of bird of prey large enough to hunt sizeable (about 50 cm long or more overall) vertebrates.

Description
Eagles are large, powerfully-built birds of prey, with heavy heads and beaks. Even the smallest eagles, such as the booted eagle (Aquila pennata), which is comparable in size to a common buzzard (Buteo buteo) or red-tailed hawk (B. jamaicensis), have relatively longer and more evenly broad wings, and more direct, faster flight – despite the reduced size of aerodynamic feathers. Most eagles are larger than any other raptors apart from some vultures. The largest species are discussed below. Like all birds of prey, eagles have very large hooked beaks for ripping flesh from their prey, strong, muscular legs, and powerful talons.

The beak is typically heavier than that of most other birds of prey. Eagles' eyes are extremely powerful. It is estimated that the martial eagle, whose eyes are more than two times larger than the human eye, has a visual acuity up to 8 times that of humans. This acuity enables eagles to spot potential prey from a very long distance. This keen eyesight is primarily attributed to their extremely large pupils which ensure minimal diffraction (scattering) of the incoming light. The female of all known species of eagles is larger than the male. 

Eagles normally build their nests, called eyries, in tall trees or on high cliffs. Many species lay two eggs, but the older, larger chick frequently kills its younger sibling once it has hatched. The parents take no action to stop the killing.
It is said that eagles fly above clouds but this is not true. Eagles fly during storms and glide from the wind’s pressure. This saves the bird's energy. 
Due to the size and power of many eagle species, they are ranked at the top of the food chain as apex predators in the avian world. The type of prey varies by genus. The Haliaeetus and Ichthyophaga eagles prefer to capture fish, though the species in the former often capture various animals, especially other water birds, and are powerful kleptoparasites of other birds. The snake and serpent eagles of the genera Circaetus, Terathopius, and Spilornis predominantly prey on the great diversity of snakes found in the tropics of Africa and Asia. The eagles of the genus Aquila are often the top birds of prey in open habitats, taking almost any medium-sized vertebrate they can catch. Where Aquila eagles are absent, other eagles, such as the buteonine black-chested buzzard-eagle of South America, may assume the position of top raptorial predator in open areas. Many other eagles, including the species-rich genus Spizaetus, live predominantly in woodlands and forests. These eagles often target various arboreal or ground-dwelling mammals and birds, which are often unsuspectingly ambushed in such dense, knotty environments. Hunting techniques differ among the species and genera, with some individual eagles having engaged in quite varied techniques based on their environment and prey at any given time. Most eagles grab prey without landing and take flight with it, so the prey can be carried to a perch and torn apart.

The bald eagle is noted for having flown with the heaviest load verified to be carried by any flying bird, since one eagle flew with a  mule deer fawn. However, a few eagles may target prey considerably heavier than themselves; such prey is too heavy to fly with, thus it is either eaten at the site of the kill or taken in pieces back to a perch or nest. Authors on birds David Allen Sibley, Pete Dunne, and Clay Sutton described the behavioral difference between hunting eagles and other birds of prey thus (in this case the bald and golden eagles as compared to other North American raptors):

They have at least one singular characteristic. It has been observed that most birds of prey look back over their shoulders before striking prey (or shortly thereafter); predation is after all a two-edged sword. All hawks seem to have this habit, from the smallest kestrel to the largest Ferruginous – but not the Eagles.

Among the eagles are some of the largest birds of prey: only the condors and some of the Old World vultures are markedly larger. It is regularly debated which should be considered the largest species of eagle. They could be measured variously in total length, body mass, or wingspan. Different lifestyle needs among various eagles result in variable measurements from species to species. For example, many forest-dwelling eagles, including the very large harpy eagle, have relatively short wingspans, a feature necessary for being able to maneuver in quick, short bursts through densely forested habitats. Eagles in the genus Aquila, found almost exclusively in open country, are noted for their ability to soar, and have relatively long wings for their size.

These lists of the top five eagles are based on weight, length, and wingspan, respectively. Unless otherwise noted by reference, the figures listed are the median reported for each measurement in the guide Raptors of the World in which only measurements that could be personally verified by the authors were listed.

Habitat 
The eagles are generally distributed in all types of habitats and nearly all parts of the world. The birds can be found in northern tundra to tropical rainforests and deserts. In North America, bald eagles and golden eagles are very common.

The other nine species are endemic to Central and South America. The birds have a highly concentrated population in the Africa and eastern hemisphere. Several islands in the Indian and Pacific Oceans are also rich and have distinct species of eagles.

Distribution
Australasian
 Australia: wedge-tailed eagle (range extends into southern New Guinea), white-bellied sea-eagle (range extends into Asia), little eagle.
 New Guinea: Papuan eagle, white-bellied sea-eagle, pygmy eagle.
Nearctic (USA and Canada): golden eagle (also found in Palearctic), bald eagle.
Neotropical (Central and South America): Spizaetus (four species), solitary eagles (two spp.), harpy eagle, crested eagle, black-chested buzzard-eagle.
Palearctic 
Eurasia: Golden eagle, White-tailed eagle.
Africa: African fish eagle, Martial Eagle, Crowned eagle, Verreaux's eagle, Tawny eagle, Long-crested eagle

Groups
Eagles are often informally divided into four groups.

The snake eagles are placed in the subfamily Circaetinae. The fish eagles, booted eagles, and harpy eagles have traditionally been placed in the subfamily Buteoninae together with the buzzard-hawks (buteonine hawks) and harriers. Some authors may treat these groups as tribes of the Buteoninae; Lerner & Mindell proposed separating the eagle groups into their own subfamilies of Accipitridae.

Fish eagles
Sea eagles or fish eagles take fish as a large part of their diets, either fresh or as carrion.

Proposed subfamily Haliaeetinae. Genera: Haliaeetus, Ichthyophaga.

Some authors include Gypohierax angolensis, the "vulturine fish eagle" (also called the palm-nut vulture) in this group. However, genetic analyses indicate it is related to a grouping of Neophron–Gypaetus–Eutriorchis (Egyptian vulture, bearded vulture (lammergeier), and Madagascar serpent eagle).

The fish eagles have a close genetic relationship with Haliastur and Milvus; the whole group is only distantly related to the Buteo group.

Booted eagles

Booted eagles or "true eagles" have feathered tarsi (lower legs).

Tribe Aquililae or proposed subfamily Aquilinae. Genera: Aquila, Hieraaetus; Spizaetus, Oroaetus, Spizastur; Nisaetus; Ictinaetus, Lophoaetus; Polemaetus; and Stephanoaetus.

See comments under eagle species for changes to the composition of these genera.

Snake eagles
Most snake or serpent eagles, as the name suggests, primarily prey on snakes.

 Subfamily Circaetinae. Genera: Circaetus, Spilornis, Dryotriorchis, Terathopius.
 Eutriorchis (subfamily Gypaetinae or Circaetinae).

Despite filling the niche of a snake eagle, genetic studies suggest that the Madagascar serpent eagle (Eutriorchis) is not related to them.

Harpy eagles
Harpy eagles or "giant forest eagles" are large eagles that inhabit tropical forests. The group contains two to six species, depending on the author. Although these birds occupy similar niches and have traditionally been grouped, they are not all related: the solitary eagles are related to the black hawks and the Philippine eagle to the snake eagles.

 Harpy eagles (proposed subfamily Harpiinae)
 Harpia harpyja, harpy eagle ― Central and South America.
 Morphnus guianensis, crested eagle ― Central and South America.
 Harpyopsis novaeguineae, Papuan eagle ― New Guinea.
 Philippine eagle
 Pithecophaga jefferyi, Philippine eagle ― Philippines.
 Solitary eagles
 Chaco eagle or crowned solitary eagle, Buteogallus (formerly Harpyhaliaetus) coronatus ― South America.
 Solitary eagle or montane solitary eagle, Buteogallus (formerly Harpyhaliaetus) solitarius ― South America.

Species

Major new research into eagle taxonomy suggests that the important genera Aquila and Hieraaetus are not composed of nearest relatives, and it is likely that a reclassification of these genera will soon take place, with some species being moved to Lophaetus or Ictinaetus.
Bonelli's eagle and the African hawk-eagle have been moved from Hieraaetus to Aquila.
Either the greater spotted eagle and lesser spotted eagle should move from Aquila to join the long-crested eagle in Lophaetus, or, perhaps better, all three of these species should move to Ictinaetus with the black eagle.
The steppe eagle and tawny eagle, once thought to be conspecific, are not even each other's nearest relatives.

Family Accipitridae

Subfamily Buteoninae – hawks (buzzards), true eagles and seaeagles
Genus Geranoaetus
Black-chested buzzard-eagle, Geranoaetus melanoleucus
Genus Harpyhaliaetus
Chaco eagle, Harpyhaliaetus coronatus
Solitary eagle, H. solitarius
Genus Morphnus
Crested eagle, Morphnus guianensis
Genus Harpia
Harpy eagle, Harpia harpyja
Genus Pithecophaga
Philippine eagle, Pithecophaga jefferyi
Genus Harpyopsis
Papuan eagle, Harpyopsis novaeguineae
Genus Spizaetus
Black hawk-eagle, S. tyrannus
Ornate hawk-eagle, S. ornatus
Black-and-white hawk-eagle, S. melanoleucus – formerly Spizastur
Black-and-chestnut eagle, S. isidori – formerly Oroaetus
Genus Nisaetus – previously included in Spizaetus
Changeable hawk-eagle, N. cirrhatus
Flores hawk-eagle N. floris – earlier a subspecies, S. c. floris
Sulawesi hawk-eagle, N. lanceolatus
Mountain hawk-eagle, N. nipalensis
Legge's hawk-eagle, Nisaetus kelaarti – previously a race of S. nipalensis
Blyth's hawk-eagle, N. alboniger
Javan hawk-eagle, N. bartelsi
(Northern) Philippine hawk-eagle, N. philippensis
Pinsker's hawk-eagle (Southern Philippine hawk-eagle), Nisaetus pinskeri – earlier S. philippensis pinskeri
Wallace's hawk-eagle, N. nanus
Genus Lophaetus
Long-crested eagle, Lophaetus occipitalis – possibly belongs in Ictinaetus
Genus Stephanoaetus
Crowned eagle, Stephanoaetus coronatus
Malagasy crowned eagle, Stephanoaetus mahery
Genus Polemaetus
Martial eagle, Polemaetus bellicosus
Genus Hieraaetus
Ayres's hawk-eagle, H. ayresii
Little eagle, H. morphnoides
Pygmy eagle, H. weiskei – previously subspecies H. m. weiskei
Booted eagle, H. pennatus
Haast's eagle, †H. moorei
Genus Lophotriorchis
Rufous-bellied eagle, L. kienerii 
Genus Aquila
Bonelli's eagle, Aquila fasciata – formerly Hieraaetus fasciatus
African hawk-eagle, A. spilogaster – formerly in Hieraaetus
Cassin's hawk-eagle, A. africana – formerly in Hieraaetus or Spizaetus genera
Golden eagle, A. chrysaetos
Eastern imperial eagle, A. heliaca
Spanish imperial eagle A. adalberti
Steppe eagle, A. nipalensis
Tawny eagle, A. rapax
Greater spotted eagle, A. clanga – to be moved to Lophaetus or Ictinaetus
Lesser spotted eagle, A. pomarina – to be moved to Lophaetus or Ictinaetus
Indian spotted eagle, A. hastata – to be moved to Lophaetus or Ictinaetus
Verreaux's eagle, A. verreauxii
Gurney's eagle, A. gurneyi
Wahlberg's eagle, A. wahlbergi – to be moved to Hieraaetus
Wedge-tailed eagle, A. audax
Genus Ictinaetus
Black eagle, Ictinaetus malayensis
Genus Haliaeetus
White-tailed eagle, Haliaeetus albicilla
Bald eagle, H. leucocephalus
Steller's sea eagle, H. pelagicus
African fish eagle, H. vocifer
White-bellied sea eagle, H. leucogaster
Sanford's sea eagle, H. sanfordi
Madagascar fish eagle, H. vociferoides
Pallas' sea eagle, H. leucoryphus
Genus Ichthyophaga
Lesser fish eagle, Ichthyophaga humilis
Grey-headed fish eagle, I. ichthyaetus

Subfamily Circaetinae: snake-eagles
Genus Terathopius
Bateleur, Terathopius ecaudatus
Genus Circaetus
Short-toed snake eagle, Circaetus gallicus
Beaudouin's snake eagle, Circaetus beaudouini
Black-chested snake eagle, C. pectoralis
Brown snake eagle, C. cinereus
Fasciated snake eagle, C. fasciolatus
Western banded snake eagle, C. cinerascens
Genus Dryotriorchis
Congo serpent eagle, D. spectabilis
Genus Spilornis
Crested serpent eagle, Spilornis cheela
Central Nicobar serpent eagle, S. minimus (subspecies or species)
Great Nicobar serpent eagle, S. klossi
Mountain serpent eagle, S. kinabaluensis
Sulawesi serpent eagle, S. rufipectus
Philippine serpent eagle, S. holospilus
Andaman serpent eagle, S. elgini
Genus Eutriorchis
Madagascar serpent eagle, Eutriorchis astur

In culture

Etymology

Old English used the term , related to Scandinavia's ørn/örn.

In the southern part of Finland, near the Gulf of Finland, is the town of Kotka, which literally means "eagle", while the town of L'Aquila in the central part of Italy literally means "the eagle".

In Britain before 1678, eagle referred specifically to the golden eagle, with the other native species, the white-tailed eagle, being known as erne. The modern name "golden eagle" for aquila chrysaetos was introduced by the naturalist John Ray.

The village of Eagle in Lincolnshire, England, has nothing to do with the bird; its name is derived from the Old English words for "oak" and "wood" (compare Oakley).

Religion and spirituality

In ancient Sumerian mythology, the mythical king Etana was said to have been carried into heaven by an eagle. Classical writers such as Lucan and Pliny the Elder claimed that the eagle was able to look directly at the sun, and that they forced their fledglings to do the same. Those that blinked would be cast from the nest. This belief persisted until the Medieval era.

The eagle is the patron animal of the ancient Greek god Zeus. In particular, Zeus was said to have taken the form of an eagle in order to abduct Ganymede, and there are numerous artistic depictions of the eagle Zeus bearing Ganymede aloft, from Classical times up to the present (see illustrations in the Ganymede (mythology) page.)

Psalm 103 (in Greek, Latin, and English) mentions renewing one's youth "as the eagle" (although the Hebrew word נשר apparently means vulture). Augustine of Hippo gives a curious explanation of this in his commentary on the Psalms.

An eagle is a common form in the Anglican tradition, often used to support the Bible because of the symbolism of spreading the gospel over the world. Additional symbolic meanings for "eagle" include the pronouncements to the Israelites in Exodus 19:4; Psalms 103:5 and Isaiah 40:31.
The United States eagle feather law stipulates that only individuals of certifiable Native American ancestry enrolled in a federally recognized tribe are legally authorized to obtain eagle feathers for religious or spiritual reasons. In Canada, the poaching of eagle feathers for the booming U.S. market has sometimes resulted in the arrests of First Nations person for the crime.

The Moche people of ancient Peru worshiped the eagle and often depicted eagles in their art.

While every Native American tribe has their own set of customs and beliefs, one thing virtually every tribe has in common is a reverence for eagles. Native Americans view them as powerful medicine animals that represent bravery, honor, and insight. In addition, because eagles have the ability to fly, many tribes view them as having a connection to the Creator and possessing the ability to communicate with both the physical and supernatural worlds. In fact, the mythical Native American bird, the thunderbird, is based on the eagle and yet is considered to have even greater powers.

For Native Americans, eagle feathers are also sacred. Eagles and their feathers are protected under federal law. However, Native Americans with certified ancestry are permitted to obtain and use eagle feathers in spiritual ceremonies. Traditionally, when a warrior displayed bravery in a battle, he was given an eagle feather. Hence, the iconic headdresses worn by the plains tribes that contained many eagle feathers represented a brave and powerful warrior. In addition, Native Americans believe that if a person finds an eagle feather on the ground, it is a gift from the Sky and the Earth.

Heraldry

Eagles are an exceptionally common symbol in heraldry, being considered the "King of Birds" in contrast to the lion, the "King of Beasts".  Whereas the lion (e.g. England) usually represents authority, the eagle is the symbol of power. They are particularly popular in Germanic countries such as Austria, due to their association with the Holy Roman Empire. The eagle of the Holy Roman Empire was two-headed, supposedly representing the two divisions, East and West, of the old Roman Empire.  This motif, derived from the Byzantine (Eastern Roman) Empire was also adopted by the Russian Empire and is still featured in the Flag of Albania. The Roman eagle was preceded by the eagle of Ptolemaic Egypt and the Achaemenid Empire. In the coat of arms of Kotka, Finland, the eagle is depicted carrying an anchor and the caduceus on its feet.

Heraldic eagles are most often found displayed, i.e. with their wings and legs extended. They can also occur close, i.e. with their wings folded, or rising, i.e. about to take flight. The heads, wings, and legs of eagles can also be found independently.

Notes

References

External links

 PBS Nature: Eagles
 Eagle photos  on Oriental Bird Images
 Eagle videos on the Internet Bird Collection
 Web of the Conservation Biology Team-Bonelli's Eagle, of the University of Barcelona
 Decorah Eagles: 24/7 Live Webcam from The Raptor Resource Project 
 EagleCAM: White-bellied Sea Eagles Live Webcam at Discovery Centre in Sydney, Australia
 

 
Accipitridae
Apex predators
Bird common names
Vultures
National symbols of Armenia
National symbols of Austria
National symbols of the Czech Republic
National symbols of Germany
National symbols of Ghana
National symbols of Liechtenstein
National symbols of Mexico
National symbols of Nigeria
National symbols of Poland
National symbols of Romania
National symbols of Serbia
National symbols of Spain
National symbols of Syria
National symbols of Yemen
National symbols of Zambia